The Turkish Air Force Academy (TAFA) is a four-year co-educational military academy located in the city of Istanbul, Turkey. It is part of the National Defence University. It is the main human resource for the Turkish Air Force Command.

It was founded in 1951, replacing the Army Flight School, with the mandate to train the officers of the Turkish Air Force. The academy provides an engineering education to Air Force cadets from Turkey as well as a number of other countries, and prepares them for careers in their respective Air Forces. TuAFA is recognized by the Turkish Council of Higher Education, as a university accredited to grant engineering degrees. It should not be confused with the Air War College (Hava Harp Enstitüsü).

Since 1992, the academy has accepted female cadets and allied countries' cadets for enrolment. Accepting cadets not only from  Turkey but from all over the world makes this college unique.

The aim of the academy is to produce officers who have:
The qualities required in a soldier
Commandership, management and leadership skills
Military and general knowledge
Morally and mentally developed personality
Physical competence required for conditions of aviation

With its core values, the college seeks to develop officer candidates' integrity, bravery and honour.

History

The Air Force Academy was first founded (as the “Air School”) in order to develop Turkish Military Aviation. It began operations on July 3, 1912 in Yeşilköy,  then moved to Eskişehir in 1926 and France-trained Captain Muzaffer GÖKSENIN became its first director. As a result of developments in aviation and, in particular with the introduction of jet fighters into the Force, Chief of Staff of the Air Force Lieutenant General Muzaffer GÖKSENIN transformed the Air School in Eskişehir was into the Air Force Academy on October 1, 1951 under the command of Staff Colonel Gavsi UÇAGÖK. The 56 Air Force 3rd Lieutenants who graduated on August 30, 1953 were the first officers who were trained by the Air Force Academy exclusively. On the same day the Air Force Academy received its standard from the Air Force Commander Lieutenant General Fevzi UÇANER on behalf of the President of the Turkish Republic.

On September 17, 1954, the Air Force Academy was moved to İzmir due to the inadequacies in Eskişehir. 
In 1955 flight training was moved back to the period after the initial two-year academic education and the number of trainees was increased from 68 to 136. 1955 was the most populous year of the academy with 429 cadets enrolled in that year. In the same year, a first female cadet was recruited. After 1960 the Air Military High School became the main source of Cadets for the Air Force Academy. Civilian high schools became secondary sources of students. Rapid improvements in aviation and space technologies demanded fundamental changes in the education and training provided by the academy.  On July 4, 1967 the academy was moved to İstanbul in order to be able to access the resources and instructors of the universities and War Academies. The facilities which were constructed in Yeşilyurt İstanbul for the Air Military High School were converted for the Air Force Academy.

On August 30, 1968 the Air Force Academy had its first graduates in İstanbul. The duration of the training was expanded from two years to three years in the  1969-1970 education period, and to four years in 1974. Until 1960 female cadets had been admitted to the academy. In 1992 after 32 years once again they began to be admitted, and a total number of 134 female officers have graduated from the academy from 1996 to the present (2011). Since 1992, 120 cadets of friendly and allied countries have also been trained in the Turkish Air Force Academy. On May 17, 2000 the Air Force Academy Dean of the Faculty was established. The foundation of the Air Force Academy Dean of the Faculty was a milestone in support of the academic activities to be implemented in a modern and efficient way. The Aeronautics and Space Technologies Institute was founded in 2001 for graduate studies. The institute serves as a higher education institute for both Air Force and other service branches.

The Air Force Academy covers an area of 4.5 million square meters. Indoor and outdoor facilities are at Yeşilyurt, Istanbul and flight and encampment facilities are at Yalova.

After 2016 Turkish coup d'état attempt Naval academy (along with Military Academy, Air Force Academy and the all other military educational institutions) became part of the new National Defence University which is formed under Ministry of National Defence.

Education 

The Academy's aim is to have pilot candidates who are trained in modern science and technology, and capable of dealing with the problems and issues of military daily life, and also with the attributes and abilities to strengthen the Turkish Armed Forces. The Academy uses different ways to achieve those aims via military, academic, affective domain, and physical education and training. TAFA is a four-year institution of higher learning, providing an academic education, military training and physical training.

Academic program

Undergraduate programs 
The Academy educates cadets within the following departments in contemporary academic knowledge and skills with theoretical and practical lessons: Aeronautical Engineering, Electronic Engineering, Computer Engineering, Industrial Engineering, Applied Sciences, Military And Social Sciences, Foreign Languages, and Administrative Science.

Graduate programs 
The Aeronautics and Space Technologies Institute (ASTIN) initially offered graduate programs in Aeronautics, Electronics, Computer, and Industrial Engineering subjects. An Aerospace program was initiated in the 2003-2004 academic year. The graduate program which offered 4 Master of Science (M.S.) programs at the start now continues with 5 programs. In addition, a Doctor of Philosophy (Ph.D.) program in 4 disciplines is now being offered, and as well as the Master of Science programs, there is a newly opened program in Administrative Science, which aims to increase the management abilities of the cadets.

Physical training 
In the academy, cadets trained to become jet pilots are prepared both physically and psychologically for demanding situations that they will face.

The aims of the Physical Training Department are to get cadets enjoy doing sports, to contribute to the physical development of the cadets, to ensure the cadets consider sports as a way of life and do sports life-time and to teach cadets the sports techniques needed to do sports by themselves.

CISM (Conseil International du Sport Militaire) and EUAFA (European Air Force Academies) sports events are held each year and the relevant teams attend the events.

The sports branches in the academy are:
Shooting, Track Field, Basketball, Fencing, Soccer, Aeronautical Pentathlon, Handball, Cross Country, Orienteering, Table Tennis, Taekwondo, Volleyball, Swimming, Tennis, Chess. In all sports branches the aim is to develop body and brain together. All cadets must take part in a sport branch.

Military training 
Military training is provided under the programs Mechanic Marksmanship and Rifle Practice, Military Culture, Protocol and Rules of Good Manners.

The purpose of Military Training is to inculcate discipline and the spirit of a soldier, to gain leadership in order to behave as a team commander when needed, to gain moral qualities which every soldier must possess, to gain physical efficiency, endurance, initiative and the spirit of a warrior.

During the Air Force Academy education period, cadets also receive Applied Flight Training.  With the help of this training, cadets improve their knowledge and skills about aviation.

Cadets also receive Leadership Training and Character Training.

Social Clubs 
The purpose of the activities of pedagogical clubs is improving cadets’ abilities which they already have, providing them with a study of science and fine arts and providing opportunity for them to gain new abilities, increasing their good manners and general knowledge.

Cadets taking part in these clubs display their works at the Eagles’ week every year or on other occasions. Following are the social clubs in the Air Force Academy; Band Club, Music Club, Drawing/Marbling Club, Folk Dance Club, Model Aircraft, Electronics Club, Media Club, Drama Club.

In addition, Project, Computer, Second Language Learning and English Conversation clubs are other extra curricular activities.

Supporting services 
The Academy also contains supporting services such as Security Company Command, Light Weapon Maintenance Unit, Photograph Studio, Service Company Command, Engineering – Maintenance Battalion Command, Communications Electronics and Information Systems Company Command, Band Command and Transportation Battalion Command.

References

External links
Turkish Air Force Academy Website

 
Military units and formations established in 1851
1951 establishments in Turkey